Gabriel González Chaves (born 18 March 1961) is a former football player from Paraguay that used to play as a forward or attacking midfielder.

Mostly known as "El Loco" González, he is one of the most recognized and loved players by fans of Club Olimpia of Paraguay. While playing for Olimpia, González won the Copa Libertadores, Supercopa Sudamericana, Recopa Sudamericana and several Paraguayan league titles, forming the feared Olimpia attacking trio of the early 1990s with teammates Adriano Samaniego and Raúl Vicente Amarilla. González was an extremely talented player, with good vision and passing skills, as well as finishing which allowed him to play as either a forward or attacking midfielder.

"El Loco" also played for Argentine sides Estudiantes de La Plata and Colón de Santa Fe. In the latter, he became an idol of the Colón supporters after helping the team getting promoted to the first division in the 1994/95 season. In Peru, he played for Universitario de Deportes.

González earned the nickname "El Loco" (crazy) because of his unusual behavior and also for his "crazy" skills displayed on the pitch. His unusual behavior caused him trouble in a 2001 game where, while playing for Olimpia, he got sent off. Because he disagreed with the call he punched the referee (who had to go to the hospital immediately) and the aftermath was a permanent suspension from playing football   which was later reduced to 2 and a half years. He played one more match when he came on as a substitute against Libertad on 5 March 2004 before announcing his retirement.

Despite the incident, he still is regarded as an idol by the fans of both Olimpia and Colón de Santa Fe.

International 
González made his international debut for the Paraguay national football team on 14 June 1987 in a friendly match against Bolivia (0-2 win). He obtained a total number of 34 international caps, scoring two goals for the national side.

Honours
Olympia
Jawaharlal Nehru Centenary Club Cup: 1990

See also
 Players and Records in Paraguayan Football

References

External links
 Gonzalez Profile 
 rsssf

1961 births
Living people
People from Guairá Department
Paraguayan footballers
Paraguayan expatriate footballers
Club Olimpia footballers
Estudiantes de La Plata footballers
Club Atlético Colón footballers
Expatriate footballers in Argentina
Expatriate footballers in Peru
Club Universitario de Deportes footballers
1987 Copa América players
1991 Copa América players
1993 Copa América players
Association football forwards
Paraguay international footballers
Sportivo Luqueño managers
Club General Díaz (Luque) managers